FIDO Friendly is an American dog travel and lifestyle magazine. It is published bi-monthly and includes topics like hotel and destination reviews, health and wellness topics, dog training advice, celebrity interviews, and the latest fashion trends.

Founder of "Get Your Licks on Route 66", an annual month-long pet adoption campaign, is held to promote animal wellness and shelter adoptions. FIDO Friendly is also co-operatively involved with over 30 non-profit organizations, including North Shore Animal League America.

Publisher Susan Sims hosts FIDO Friendly Travel Talk on Animal Radio. Sims co-hosts a podcast with the editor Nicholas Sveslosky, Travel Tails for Pet Life Radio.

References

External links
Official website

Bimonthly magazines published in the United States
Lifestyle magazines published in the United States
Animal and pet magazines
Dogs as pets
Dogs in the United States
Magazines established in 2003
Magazines published in Idaho
Tourism magazines